Una Leyenda Viva Llamada El Tri (A Living Legend Called El Tri) (1990) is the seventh studio album by Mexican rock and blues band El Tri.

Track listing 
All tracks by Alex Lora except where noted.

 "Casa, Comida y Sustento" (Home, Food and Wellbeing) – 3:21 
 "Viejas de Vecindad (Neighborhood's Old Hags) – 4:34
 "Otra Garrapata Más (One More Tick) – 5:10 
 "El Desempleado (The Unemployed) – 3:49
 "Me Voy a Suicidar (I'm Going To Commit Suicide) – 3:35
 "Rie (Laugh) – 2:56
 "Millones de Niños (Millions of Kids) – 6:35
 "Como Una Lombriz (Like a Worm) – 3:28
 "Nuestra Realidad (Our Reality) – 2:10

Personnel 
 Alex Lora – guitar, vocals
 Rafael Salgado – harmonic
 Sergio Mancera – electric and rhythm guitar
 Pedro Martínez – drums
 Ruben Soriano – bass

External links
www.eltri.com.mx
Una Leyenda Viva Llamada El Tri at MusicBrainz
[ Una Leyenda Viva Llamada El Tri] at AllMusic

El Tri albums
1990 albums
Warner Music Group albums